Saitovo (Häyet) is a rural locality (a village) in Razinsky Selsoviet, Fyodorovsky District, Bashkortostan, Russia. The population was 307 as of 2010. There are 4 streets.

Geography 
Saitovo is located 37 km southeast of Fyodorovka (the district's administrative centre) by road. Saitovsky is the nearest rural locality.

References 

Rural localities in Fyodorovsky District